The Metro Cinema was an independent cinema in Derby, United Kingdom, with one screen. It showed many independent, arthouse and foreign films, as well as some older mainstream films.

For most of its life, the cinema was located on Green Lane, but it relocated to the University of Derby campus in 2007. In 2008, it closed, in preparation for a move to the new Derby QUAD development in the city centre.

References

Cinemas in Derbyshire
Culture in Derby
Buildings and structures in Derby